Nick Kwant (born 1 March 1997) is a New Zealand cricketer. He made his Twenty20 debut for Canterbury in the 2017–18 Super Smash on 14 December 2017.

References

External links
 

1997 births
Living people
New Zealand cricketers
Place of birth missing (living people)
Canterbury cricketers